Große Isar is a branch of the river Isar in Munich, Bavaria, Germany.

See also
List of rivers of Bavaria

Rivers of Bavaria
0Große Isar
Rivers of Germany